Dvory nad Lužnicí is a municipality and village in Jindřichův Hradec District in the South Bohemian Region of the Czech Republic. It has about 400 inhabitants. It lies on the Lužnice River.

History
The municipality was historically a part of Lower Austria before 1920. In 1920 it was incorporated into Czechoslovakia as a result of Treaty of Saint-Germain-en-Laye.

Notable people
Zuzana Roithová (born 1953), politician; lives here

References

Villages in Jindřichův Hradec District